Jubilee is the third studio album by American alternative pop band Japanese Breakfast, released on June 4, 2021 through Dead Oceans. Released shortly after the publication of her memoir Crying in H Mart, frontwoman Michelle Zauner said, "After spending the last five years writing about grief," she wanted Japanese Breakfast's third album "to be about joy".

Upon release, Jubilee received widespread acclaim from critics who praised its joyfulness and its production. It received a nomination for Best Alternative Music Album at the 64th Annual Grammy Awards and won 4 Libera Awards, including Record of the Year. Commercially, it is the group's most successful album, becoming their first to chart on the Billboard 200 where it peaked at number 56.

Themes and composition 
Jubilee has been labeled as an alternative pop, dream pop, and indie pop record. Zauner has described the album as being about joy. This is in contrast to her previous two albums, Psychopomp (2016) and Soft Sounds from Another Planet (2017), both of which had prevalent themes of grief surrounding her mother's death from pancreatic cancer in 2014.

Zauner took music theory lessons and studied piano in preparation for Jubilee. She noted "I was just able to incorporate more interesting chord changes and write more on piano for the first time."

The first song written for the album was "Be Sweet", which Zauner wrote with Wild Nothing lead singer Jack Tatum years before Jubilee's release. "I’ve been holding onto it for so long and am so excited to finally put it out there," she said.

Jubilee was produced using the digital audio workstation (DAW) software Pro Tools. The production of the song "Paprika" resulted in the Pro Tools session maxing out due to the large number of tracks being used.

Release and promotion
The first single, "Be Sweet", and its self-directed music video were released on March 2, 2021. In The X-Files-inspired video, Zauner and Marisa "Missy" Dabice act as FBI Agents tracking aliens while the former reprises her role as Shelley Breakfast which originated in the music video for American power pop band Charly Bliss' single, "Capacity". To promote the album, on March 15, Japanese Breakfast performed the songs "Be Sweet" and "Jimmy Fallon Big!" on The Tonight Show Starring Jimmy Fallon.

The second single, "Posing in Bondage", and its music video were released on April 8, 2021. The video, also directed by Zauner, depicts her entering a grocery store late at night while covered in blood. The store is empty except for a single employee, played by Harmony Tividad.

The third single, "Savage Good Boy", was released on May 19, 2021. Zauner said in a statement about the song, Savage Good Boy' came from a headline I read about billionaires buying bunkers. I was interested in examining that specific type of villainy, and I found myself adopting the perspective of a rich man coaxing a young woman to come live with him underground, attempting to rationalize his almost impossible share of greed and miserliness". The video, directed by Zauner, features actor Michael Imperioli and is a prequel to the previous video for "Posing in Bondage". In it, Imperioli plays the billionaire in a bunker, with Zauner as the young woman he has convinced to live underground with him.

Japanese Breakfast performed three songs from the album on CBS This Morning, the day after the album's release. A version of "Be Sweet" with vocals in the fictional Simlish language is included in the eleventh expansion pack for The Sims 4, Cottage Living, released on July 22, 2021.

On May 21, 2022, Japanese Breakfast performed "Be Sweet" and "Paprika" as the musical guest for the season-finale episode of Saturday Night Live. Zauner also made a cameo in the skit "Women's Commercial."

Critical reception and accolades

Jubilee was met with widespread critical acclaim. Critics lauded the album's joyous tone, Zauner's storytelling abilities, the songs' hooks and the album's production. At Metacritic, which assigns a normalized rating out of 100 to reviews from professional publications, the album received an average score of 88, based on 19 reviews.

Zack Ruskin of Variety noted that the album deals with a "different type of catharsis" and that it "takes all the things that have always served Japanese Breakfast well – Zauner's awareness of her voice and how best to deploy it, her knack for narrative and story as well as great hooks – and offers them fresh soil in which to grow". Alisha Mughal of Exclaim! also noted the album's approach to catharsis, stating that the album offers "a validation of whatever it is you feel" and that Zauner's voice makes listeners "feel alive". Jillian Mapes of Pitchfork considered the album to be "an interesting example of pop's fluidity" and deemed Zauner's energy on the album to be "infectious". The Quietus' Ed Power also lauded the album's joyous tone while both writers noted the album's darker songs such as "In Hell" that deal with grief.

Zauner's perceived maturation in the album was also acclaimed. Clash magazine's Sam Walker-Smart found Zauner to be "fully unshackled for the first time, keeping the emotive core of her songwriting and marrying it with boundless energy and ambition". Sean Kerwick of DIY also observed maturation in the singer, describing her as "older and wiser with melody, lyrics and storytelling pulling focus" with results that establish her as a dominant "creative force".

However, the album's second half was criticized as being uneven by few. In a mostly positive review, Ethan Gordon of No Ripcord opined that during the album's second half, "things don't click as strongly" though he stated that the song "Savage Good Boy" salvages "the end of the album". Tom Hull regarded the album's first half as "glorious pop", but concluding that the rest "tails off a bit".

Year-end lists
Jubilee was ranked by publications such as Consequence Of Sound, The Guardian, NPR, Paste, Pitchfork, Rolling Stone, Slant as one of the best albums of 2021. Additionally, the album placed fifth on Metacritic's 2021 end of year lists.

Awards 
Jubilee was nominated for the Grammy Award for Best Alternative Music Album at the 64th Annual Grammy Awards although it lost to American musician St. Vincent's album Daddy's Home. It was additionally nominated for Outstanding Breakthrough Music Artist at the GLAAD Media Awards while it won four awards at the Libera Awards. Additionally, the music video for "Savage Good Boy" was nominated for the Libera Award for Video of the Year.

Track listing

Personnel
Credits are adapted from the album's liner notes.

Musicians
 Michelle Zauner – vocals, production, bass (4), piano (7), acoustic guitar (3), electric guitar (6, 7, 8, 10), percussion (1), synthesizers (1, 3, 4, 6, 8, 10) string arrangements (1, 3, 9), horn arrangements (1)
 Craig Hendrix – production (1–4, 6–10), drums (1–4, 7–10), bass (1, 3, 6–10), electric guitar (4, 8), acoustic guitar (10), slide guitar (3), Rhodes (9), piano (10), synthesizers (1, 3, 4, 6, 8, 10), percussion, string arrangements (1, 3, 9), horn arrangements (1, 4, 8), vocals (8), engineering
 Jack Tatum – production, synthesizers, programming, electric guitar, E-bow electric guitar, bass, vocals, engineering (2, 5)
 Ryan Galloway – production, electric guitar, synthesizers (4)
 Alex Giannascoli – production, Rhodes, piano, synthesizers (7)
 Molly Germer – violin (1, 3, 9)
 Veronica Jurkiewicz – viola (1, 3, 9)
 Carolina Diazgranados – cello (1, 3, 9)
 Adam Schatz – saxophone (1, 4, 8)
 Aaron Rockers – trumpet (1, 4, 8)
 Adam Dotson – trombone (1, 4, 8)

'Additional engineers
 Alex Santilli – additional engineering (1, 3, 9)
 Eric Bogacz – additional engineering (1, 3, 9)

Artwork
 Michelle Zauner – creative direction
 Peter Ash Lee – photography
 Evaline Huang – production design
 Peter Bradley – production assistant
 Cecelia Liu – styling
 Maiko Waki – hair and makeup
 Nathaniel David Utesch – layout, design

Charts

References

External links

2021 albums
Dead Oceans albums
Japanese Breakfast albums